The following is a list of islands, sorted by population density, and including islands that are connected to other land masses by a route other than sea or air, such as a bridge or a tunnel.

Most densely populated islands (over 1,000 people per km2)
Accurate density estimates for the very small islands (< 1 km2) are hard to obtain because population as well as landmass are often only estimates. Additionally, the populations of these islands are often highly transient, with many residents also maintaining a residence on a larger landmass and only living on the island seasonally.

Other notable islands

Least densely populated islands 
There are numerous uninhabited or deserted islands. The largest uninhabited island in the world is Devon Island in Canada. The list contains islands with densities below 0.1 per km2.

See also

 Lists of islands
 List of islands by population
 List of islands by area
 List of populated islands of the Great Lakes
 Hashima Island

References

 
Geography-related lists
Lists by population density